Gingicithara maraisi is a species of sea snail, a marine gastropod mollusk in the family Mangeliidae.

Description
The shell of the adult snail attains 8.5 mm.

Distribution
This marine species occurs off Durban, South Africa.

References

External links
  Tucker, J.K. 2004 Catalog of recent and fossil turrids (Mollusca: Gastropoda). Zootaxa 682:1–1295.
 Kilburn R.N. 1992. Turridae (Mollusca: Gastropoda) of southern Africa and Mozambique. Part 6. Subfamily Mangeliinae, section 1. Annals of the Natal Museum, 33: 461–575

Endemic fauna of South Africa
maraisi
Gastropods described in 1992